Tanzania Commercial Bank, formerly known as TPB Bank Plc,  is a commercial bank in Tanzania. It is licensed and supervised by the Bank of Tanzania, the central bank and national banking regulator.

History

Incorporation 
In 1925 the Tanganyika Post Office Savings Bank Ordinance was passed by the British Colonial government that established the Tanganyika Post office Savings Bank. The bank became operational in just two years in 1927.

Financial sector reform 
After the government of Tanzania began financial sector reform following the end of Ujamaa economic policies in the country, the Tanzania Post office Savings bank was transformed into a separate entity, the Tanzania Postal Bank. The Tanzania Postal Bank Act No. 11 of 1991 created the bank as a separate entity from the Tanzania Posts and Telecommunications Corporation. Since attaining its independence, the bank has provided services to a much larger population than before and it has begun to provide a profit to the government.

Public limited company 
In 2015 the bank management declared that the bank will list the bank on the Dar es Salaam Stock Exchange, in order to raise capital to expand and automate the companies operations. On January 19, 2017, the bank officially rebranded the company and Tanzania Postal Bank Limited changed its name to TPB Bank Plc.

Mergers and acquisitions 
In 2018, the Bank of Tanzania merged Twiga Bancorp and Tanzania Women's Bank into Tanzania Postal Bank due to their poor performance. In June 2020, the central bank merged TIB Commercial Bank Limited into TPB. The merger is set to bring the total assets of the bank to over 1 trillion Tanzanian Shillings.

Rebrand
In June 2021, the bank rebranded to Tanzania Commercial Bank, to reflect the national nature of the institution. At that time its total assets had increased to over TSh 1 trillion (approx. US$436 million).

Corporate affairs

Ownership 
Te table below illustrates the shareholding in the stock of TPB Bank Plc, as of 31 December 2019.

Business trends 
TPB Bank Plc bank year ends on 31 December every year.

See also

 List of banks in Tanzania

References

External links 
Official Website

Banks of Tanzania
Companies of Tanzania
Economy of Tanzania
Banks established in 1925
1925 establishments in Tanganyika
Postal savings system